Drymaeus is a large genus of medium-sized air-breathing, tropical land snails, terrestrial pulmonate gastropod molluscs in the subfamily Peltellinae  of the family Bulimulidae.

Distribution 
Distribution of genus Drymaeus include South and Central America. For example in Mexico live about 65 species of Drymaeus.

Species 
There are two subgenera: Drymaeus sensus stricto and subgenus Mesembrinus. They are accepted as alternate representations.

Species within the genus Drymaeus include:

 Drymaeus abruptus (Rolle, 1904)
 Drymaeus abyssorum (d'Orbigny, 1835)
 Drymaeus acervatus Pfeiffer, 1857
 Drymaeus acobambensis Weyrauch, 1967
 Drymaeus acuminatus Da Costa, 1906
 Drymaeus aequatorianus (E.A. Smith, 1877)
 Drymaeus aestivus (L. Pfeiffer, 1857)
 Drymaeus alabastinus (Scott, 1952)
 Drymaeus alabastrinus Da Costa, 1906
 Drymaeus albolabiatus (E.A. Smith, 1877)
 Drymaeus albostriatus (Strebel, 1882)
 Drymaeus alsophilus (Phillipi, 1867)
 Drymaeus altenai Breure, 1976
 Drymaeus amandus (L. Pfeiffer, 1855)
 Drymaeus ambustus (Reeve, 1849)
 Drymaeus amoenus (L. Pfeiffer, 1847)
 Drymaeus anceps (Albers, 1854)
 Drymaeus andai Jousseaume, 1898
 Drymaeus angulobasis Pilsbry, 1944
 Drymaeus angustus da Costa, 1906
 Drymaeus annulatus (Reeve, 1849)
 Drymaeus apicepunctatus (Preston, 1914)
 Drymaeus arcuatostriatus (L. Pfeiffer, 1855)
 Drymaeus albostriatus (Strebel, 1882)
 Drymaeus attenuatus (Pfeiffer, 1851)
 Drymaeus attenuatus pittieri (Von Martens, 1893)
 Drymaeus attenuatus varicosus (Pfeiffer, 1851)
 Drymaeus aurantiostomus Thompson & Deisler, 1982
 Drymaeus aureolus (Guppy, 1866)
 Drymaeus aurifluus (Pfeiffer, 1856)
 Drymaeus auris (L. Pfeiffer, 1866)
 Drymaeus aurisratti (Philippi, 1867)
 Drymaeus baezensis (Hidalgo, 1869)
 Drymaeus beyerleanus (Hupé, 1857)
 Drymaeus botterii (Crosse & Fischer, 1875)
 Drymaeus branneri F. Baker, 1914
 Drymaeus bugabensis (Von Martens, 1893)
 Drymaeus castilhensis Simone & Amaral, 2018
 Drymaeus castus (Pfeiffer, 1846)
 Drymaeus castus xantholeucus (Von Martens, 1893)
 Drymaeus castus porrectus (Von Martens, 1893)
 Drymaeus cecileae (Moricand, 1858)
 Drymaeus championi (Von Martens, 1893)
 Drymaeus chiapensis (Pfeiffer, 1866)
 Drymaeus chiapensis quadrifasciatus (Von Martens, 1893)
 Drymaeus chiapensis nebulosus (Von Martens, 1893)
 Drymaeus chiriquiensis DaCosta, 1901
 Drymaeus colimensis (Rolle, 1895)
 Drymaeus costaricensis (Pfeiffer, 1862)
 Drymaeus cozumelensis Richards, 1937
 Drymaeus cucullus (Morelet, 1851)
 Drymaeus dakryodes Salvador, Cavallari & Simone, 2015
 Drymaeus denticulus Breure & Borrerro, 2019
 Drymaeus discrepans (Sowerby I, 1833)
 Drymaeus dombeyanus (Férussac, 1842)
 Drymaeus dominicus (Reeve, 1850)
 Drymaeus dormani{ (W.G. Binney, 1857)
 Drymaeus droueti (Pfeiffer, 1856)
 Drymaeus droueti deletus Solem, 1955
 Drymaeus droueti sporlederi (Pfeiffer, 1866)
 Drymaeus dunkeri (Pfeiffer, 1846)
 Drymnaeus dunkeri forreri (Mousson, 1883)
 Drymaeus duplexannulus Breure & Borrerro, 2019
 Drymaeus elongatus (Röding, 1789)
 Drymaeus emeus (Say, 1829)
 Drymaeus eurystomus (Philippi, 1867)
 Drymaeus expansus (Pfeiffer, 1848)
 Drymaeus expansus balboa Pilsbry, 1926
 Drymaeus fenestratus (Pfeiffer, 1846)
 Drymaeus fenestrellus (Von Martens, 1863)
 Drymaeus fusoides (d’Orbigny, 1835)
 Drymaeus gabbi (Angas, 1879)
 Drymaeus ghiesbreghti (Pfeiffer, 1866)
 Drymaeus ghiesbreghti interstitialis (Von Martens, 1893)
 Drymaeus ghiesbreghti iodostylus (Pfeiffer, 1861)
 Drymaeus ghiesbreghti stolli (Von Martens, 1887)
 Drymaeus hegewischi (Pfeiffer, 1842)
 Drymaeus hepatostomus (Pfeiffer, 1861)
 Drymaeus heterogeneus (Pfeiffer, 1866)
 Drymaeus hondurasanus (Pfeiffer, 1846)
 Drymaeus inconspicuus (Haas, 1949)
 Drymaeus iniurius Breure & Borrerro, 2019
 Drymaeus inglorius (Reeve, 1848)
 Drymaeus inglorius heynemanni (Pfeiffer, 1866)
 Drymaeus intermissus Breure & Borrerro, 2019
 Drymaeus intrapictus Pilsbry, 1930
 Drymaeus iracema (Simone, 2015) 
 Drymaeus inusitatus (Fulton, 1900)
 Drymaeus irazuensis (Angas, 1878)
 Drymaeus jonasi (Pfeiffer, 1846)
 Drymaeus josephus (Angas, 1878)
 Drymaeus josephus concolor (Von Martens, 1893)
 Drymaeus josephus errans Pilsbry, 1926
 Drymaeus josephus maculosus (Von Martens, 1893)
 Drymaeus joubini Germain, 1907
 Drymaeus jousseaumei Dautzenberg, 1901
 Drymaeus lattrei (Pfeiffer, 1846)
 Drymaeus lattrei hiabundus (Von Martens, 1893)
 Drymaeus laticinctus (Guppy, 1868)
 Drymaeus liliaceus (Férussac, 1821)
 Drymaeus lilacinus (Reeve, 1949)
 Drymaeus lilacinus crossei (Von Martens, 1893)
 Drymaeus lilacinus ictericus (Von Martens, 1893)
 Drymaeus lilacinus jansoni (Von Martens, 1893)
 Drymaeus lilacinus undulosus (Von Martens, 1893)
 Drymaeus lilacinus unicolor (Von Martens, 1893)
 Drymaeus lineolatus (Conrad, 1855)
 Drymaeus linostoma (d'Orbigny, 1835)
 Drymaeus lirinus (Morelet, 1851)
 Drymaeus livescens (Pfeiffer, 1842)
 Drymaeus lophoicus (D'Orbigny, 1835)
 Drymaeus marmarinus (D'Orbigny, 1835)
 Drymaeus mayaorum Rehder, 1966
 Drymaeus megastomus Parodiz, 1962
 Drymaeus mexicanus (Lamarck, 1822)
 Drymaeus micropyrus Simone & Amaral, 2018
 Drymaeus moricandi (Pfeiffer, 1846)
 Drymaeus moricandi hyalinoalbidus (Fischer & Crosse, 1875)
 Drymaeus moritinctus (Von Martens, 1893)
 Drymaeus multifasciatus (Lamarck, 1822)
 Drymaeus multilineatus (Say, 1825)
 Drymaeus necaxanus Solem, 1955
 Drymaeus pamplonensis Pilsbry, 1939
 Drymaeus perductorum Rehder, 1943
 Drymaeus pilsbryi Zetek, 1933
 Drymaeus pluvialis (Pfeiffer, 1862)
 Drymaeus poecilus (d'Orbigny, 1835)
 Drymaeus polygramma (S. Moricand, 1836)
 Drymaeus ponsonbyi DaCosta, 1907
 Drymaeus praetextus (Reeve, 1850)
 Drymaeus protractus (L. Pfeiffer, 1855)
 Drymaeus pseudelatus Haas, 1951
 Drymaeus pseudobesus Breure, 1979
 Drymaeus pseudofusoides da Costa, 1906
 Drymaeus puellaris (Reeve, 1850)
 Drymaeus pulchellus (Broderip, 1832)
 Drymaeus pulcherrimus (H. Adams, 1867)
 Drymaeus punctatus Da Costa, 1907
 Drymaeus puncticulatus (L. Pfeiffer, 1857)
 Drymaeus quadrifasciatus (Angas, 1878)
 Drymaeus rabuti (Jousseaume, 1898)
 Drymaeus rawsoni (Guppy, 1871)
 Drymaeus recedens (L. Pfeiffer, 1864)
 Drymaeus recluzianus (Pfeiffer, 1847)
 Drymaeus recluzianus martensianus Pilsbry, 1899
 Drymaeus rudis (Anton, 1839)
 Drymaeus rufescens
 Drymaeus rufescens pinchoti Pilsbry, 1930
 Drymaeus sargi (Crosse & Fischer, 1875)
 Drymaeus sargi motaguae (Von Martens, 1893)
 Drymaeus schadei Quintana & Magaldi, 1985
 Drymaeus schmidti (L. Pfeiffer, 1854)
 Drymaeus schunkei Haas, 1949
 Drymaeus scitulus (Reeve, 1849)
 Drymaeus scoliodes Dautzenberg, 1902
 Drymaeus selli (Preston, 1909)
 Drymaeus semifasciatus (Mousson, 1869)
 Drymaeus semimaculatus Pilsbry, 1898
 Drymaeus semipellucidus (Tristram, 1861)
 Drymaeus serperastrus (Say, 1829)
 Drymaeus serratus (Pfeiffer, 1855)
 Drymaeus shattucki Bequaert & Clench, 1931
 Drymaeus stramineus (Guilding, 1824)
 Drymaeus strigatus (Sowerby, 1838)
 Drymaeus sulcosus (Pfeiffer, 1841)
 Drymaeus sulphureus (Pfeiffer, 1856)
 Drymaeus suprapunctatus F. Baker, 1913
 Drymaeus surinamensis Vernhout, 1914
 Drymaeus sykesi Da Costa, 1906
 Drymaeus tenuilabris (L. Pfeiffer, 1866)
 Drymaeus terreus (Simone, 2015)
 Drymaeus totonacus (Strebel, 1882)
 Drymaeus translucens (Broderip, 1832)
 Drymaeus translucens alternans (Beck, 1837)
 Drymaeus translucens juquilensis (Von Martens, 1893)
 Drymaeus translucens misellus Pilsbry, 1926
 Drymaeus translucens pachecensis Pilsbry, 1930
 Drymaeus translucens panamensis (Broderip, 1833)
 Drymaeus translucens sororcula Pilsbry, 1926
 Drymaeus translucens subfloccosus Pilsbry, 1899
 Drymaeus translucens tonosiesis Pilsbry, 1930
 Drymaeus trimarianus (Von Martens, 1893)
 Drymaeus tripictus (Albers, 1857)
 Drymaeus tripictus hoffmanni (Von Martens, 1893)
 Drymaeus tropicalis (Morelet, 1849)
 Drymaeus trujillensis (Philippi, 1867)
 Drymaeus tryoni (Fischer & Crosse, 1875)
 Drymaeus tryoni pochutlensis (Crosse & Fischer, 1875)
 Drymaeus tzubi Dourson, Caldwell & Dourson, 2018
 Drymaeus uhdeanus (Von Martens, 1893)
 Drymaeus uhdeanus borealis (Von Martens, 1893)
 Drymaeus uhdeanus cuernovacensis (Crosse & Fischer, 1874)
 Drymaeus uhdeanus tepicensis (Von Martens, 1893)
 Drymaeus verecundus Breure & Mogollón, 2019
 Drymaeus vesperus Jousseaume, 1887
 Drymaeus vexillum (Broderip, 1832) (synonym: Bulinus vexillum Broderip, 1832)
 Drymaeus vicinus (Preston, 1907)
 Drymaeus villavicioensis Breure, 1977
 Drymaeus vincentinus (L. Pfeiffer, 1846)
 Drymaeus virginalis (L. Pfeiffer, 1857)
 Drymaeus virgulatus (Férussac, 1821)
 Drymaeus volsus Fulton, 1907
 Drymaeus waldoschmidti Parodiz, 1962
 Drymaeus weeksi Pilsbry, 1926
 Drymaeus yapacanensis Breure, 1981
 Drymaeus zhorquinensis (Angas, 1879)
 Drymaeus ziczac (Da Costa, 1898)
 Drymaeus ziegleri (Pfeiffer, 1846)
 Drymaeus zilchi Haas, 1955
 Drymaeus zingarensis Restrepo & Breure, 1987
 Drymaeus zoographica (d'Orbigny, 1835)

synonyms
 Drymaeus henseli is a synonym of Anthinus henselii

References

External links
 Albers, J. C. (1850). Die Heliceen nach natürlicher Verwandtschaft systematisch geordnet. Berlin: Enslin. 262 pp.
  Pfeiffer, L. (1855-1856). Versuch einer Anordnung der Heliceen nach natürlichen Gruppen. Malakozoologische Blätter. 2(3): 112
Tree snails of Florida, Drymaeus spp. on the UF / IFAS Featured Creatures website

 
Bulimulidae
Taxonomy articles created by Polbot